Tritia elata is a species of sea snail, a marine gastropod mollusc in the family Nassariidae, the Nassa mud snails or dog whelks.

Description
The shell size varies between 10 mm and 20 mm

Distribution
This species occurs in European waters off Portugal and in the Atlantic Ocean off Angola

References

 Martens, E. von. (1881). [Description of marine Mollusca]. Conchologische Mittheilungen als Fortsetzung der Novitates Conchologicae. 2(1): 103–121, pls 21–24.
 Adam W. & Knudsen J. 1984. Révision des Nassariidae (Mollusca : Gastropoda Prosobranchia) de l’Afrique occidentale. Bulletin de l'Institut Royal des Sciences Naturelles de Belgique 55(9): 1-95, 5 pl
 Cernohorsky W. O. (1984). Systematics of the family Nassariidae (Mollusca: Gastropoda). Bulletin of the Auckland Institute and Museum 14: 1–356.
 Gofas, S.; Le Renard, J.; Bouchet, P. (2001). Mollusca, in: Costello, M.J. et al. (Ed.) (2001). European register of marine species: a check-list of the marine species in Europe and a bibliography of guides to their identification. Collection Patrimoines Naturels, 50: pp. 180–213
 Gofas, S.; Afonso, J.P.; Brandào, M. (Ed.). (S.a.). Conchas e Moluscos de Angola = Coquillages et Mollusques d'Angola. [Shells and molluscs of Angola]. Universidade Agostinho / Elf Aquitaine Angola: Angola. 140 pp

External links
 Gould, A. A. (1845). Descriptions of shells from the coast of Africa. Proceedings of the Boston Journal of Natural History. 5: 290-294.
 Marrat, F. P. (1878). List of West African shells (continued). Quarterly Journal of Conchology. 1(16): 381-382
 Fischer, P. (1862). Description d'une nouvelle espèce de Nassa. Journal de Conchyliologie. 10: 37-38
 Gofas, S.; Luque, Á. A.; Templado, J.; Salas, C. (2017). A national checklist of marine Mollusca in Spanish waters. Scientia Marina. 81(2) : 241-254, and supplementary online material.
 

Nassariidae
Gastropods described in 1845